Jean-Paul Racine (8 February 1928 – 13 January 1988) was a Liberal party member of the House of Commons of Canada. He was born in Saint-Honoré-de-Shenley, Quebec and became a lumber merchant and manufacturer by career.

He was first elected at the Beauce riding in the 1958 general election and served one term before being defeated there in 1962 by Gérard Perron of the Social Credit party. Racine was again defeated by Perron in 1963 but won the seat back in 1965 for one final Parliamentary term. In the 1968 election, he lost the seat to another Social Credit candidate, Romuald Rodrigue.

External links
 

1928 births
1988 deaths
Members of the House of Commons of Canada from Quebec
Liberal Party of Canada MPs